Jordan Richards (born January 21, 1993) is an American football free safety who is a free agent. He played college football at Stanford and was drafted by the New England Patriots in the second round of the 2015 NFL Draft.

College career
Richards played college football at Stanford, where he was a team captain and first-team All-PAC player during his final senior collegiate year. Although recruited as one top the top 100 receivers in the country, he was switched to defense and played all 13 games as a true freshman.

Professional career
Richards accepted an invitation to play in the 2015 East–West Shrine Game and practiced well throughout the week leading up to the game. He played for the West team under former Seattle Seahawks' quarterback and Washington Redskins' head coach Jim Zorn. Richards recorded three combined tackles, as the West lost 19-3 to the East. He attended the NFL combine and completed all of the required combine and positional drills. Richards lackluster performances in the 40-yard dash, vertical jump, and broad jump was thought to negatively effect his stock. His time in the three-cone drill finished in the top five amongst all safeties at the combine. On March 19, 2015, Richards opted to participate at Stanford's pro day, along with James Vaughters, Ty Montgomery, Andrus Peat, Lee Ward, A. J. Tarpley, Alex Carter, Henry Anderson, David Parry, and five others. Over 75 team representatives and scouts from every NFL team attended as Richards decided to redo his vertical jump (34½), broad jump (9'0"), 40-yard dash (4.59), 20-yard dash (2.64), 10-yard dash (1.58), and short shuttle (4.32). He performed well and was able to get better times and lengths in everything but the broad jump and short shuttle. His positional drills were led by the New England Patriots' director of player personnel Nick Caserio. At the conclusion of the pre-draft process, Richards projected to be a fifth to seventh round pick by the majority of NFL draft experts and analysts. His fall from a perspective third round pick was mostly due to his lack of preferred athletic ability and his mediocre performance at the combine. He was ranked as the seventh best strong safety prospect in the draft by NFLDraftScout.com and was ranked the 23rd best safety in the draft by NFL analyst Charles Davis.

New England Patriots
The New England Patriots selected Richards in the second round (64th overall) of the 2015 NFL Draft. Richards was the fourth safety selected in 2016, behind Damarious Randall (No. 30, Packers), Landon Collins (No. 33, Giants), and Jaquiski Tartt (No. 46, 49ers).

His selection in the second round was heavily criticized by draft analysts and the media due to his draft projection being a fifth to seventh round pick and was partially due to the fact the team already had Devin McCourty and Patrick Chung as established starters at safety. Many journalists and analysts speculated his selection by Patriots' head coach/general manager Bill Belichick was due to his solid performance in the three-cone drill, his intelligence, and high football acumen.

2015
On May 8, 2015, the Patriots signed Richards to a four-year, $3.71 million contract with $1.15 million guaranteed and a signing bonus of $959,307.

Richards was not able to attend team activities held in the spring due to Stanford following the quarters semester system and the NFL's graduation rule that does not permit players that haven't completed or graduated from their school to attend team activities. Upon arriving at training camp, he competed with Nate Ebner, Tavon Wilson, Duron Harmon, and Brandon King for the role as a backup safety. Head coach Bill Belichick named Richards the backup strong safety behind Patrick Chung to start the regular season.

He made his professional regular season debut in the Patriots' season-opening 28-21 victory against the Pittsburgh Steelers. On September 27, 2015, Richards recorded two solo tackles and deflected a pass, as the Patriots routed the Jacksonville Jaguars. He made his first career regular season tackle on Jaguars' running back Corey Grant and stopped him after an eight-yard reception in the first quarter. Richards was a healthy scratch and was inactive for two games in Weeks 13-14. On December 20, 2015, Richards earned his first career start and recorded three solo tackles and defended a pass in a 33–16 defeat over the Tennessee Titans. He started at free safety after Devin McCourty was unable to play after sustaining an ankle injury the following week against the Houston Texans. The following week, he earned his second consecutive start at free safety and recorded a season-high seven combined tackles during their 26–20 loss at the New York Jets.

The Patriots finished atop the AFC East with a 12-4 record. On January 26, 2016, he played in the first career playoff game as the Patriots defeated the Kansas City Chiefs 27-20 to advance to the AFC Championship. They suffered a 20–18 loss in the AFC Championship to the eventual Super Bowl 50 Champions, the Denver Broncos.

Richards completed his rookie season with 20 combined tackles (16 solo) and two pass deflections in 14 games and two starts. He played in 21.8% of the Patriots' defensive snaps and 51.4% of all of their special teams play.

2016
Richards entered training camp competing for a job as the backup safety against Nate Ebner, Duron Harmon, Brandon King, Brock Vereen, Vinnie Sunseri, and Cedric Thompson. He was named the third strong safety on the depth chart behind Patrick Chung and Duron Harmon to begin the  season.

On November 27, 2016, Richards suffered a knee injury while covering a punt return in the Patriots' 22–17 victory over the New York Jets. The injury caused him to miss the next three games. He made three combined tackles (one solo) in 11 games and zero starts and was limited to special teams throughout the  season.

The Patriots finished first in their division with a 14-2 record. On February 5, 2017, the Patriots appeared in Super Bowl LI and defeated the Atlanta Falcons in a 34–28 overtime victory. Richards was a healthy scratch for all three playoff games

2017
Richards started the Patriots' season-opener against the Kansas City Chiefs and recorded six combined tackles and forced the first fumble of his career in a 42–27 loss. Richards started as a hybrid outside linebacker and was tasked with covering one of the Chiefs' tight ends in dime packages. He recorded twice as many tackles then he did the entire 2016 season and played 41 defensive snaps, well above his total of 16 snaps for 2016. During a Week 6 matchup against the New York Jets, Richards earned his second start of the season as a hybrid coverage linebacker and recorded three solo tackles in a 24–17 win for New England. Richards helped the Patriots reach Super Bowl LII, but lost 41-33 to the Philadelphia Eagles with Richards recording five tackles in the game.

Atlanta Falcons
On August 31, 2018, Richards was traded to the Atlanta Falcons for a conditional 2020 seventh-round draft pick. He played in 15 games with 12 starts, recording 39 tackles and three passes defensed.

Oakland Raiders
On April 5, 2019, Richards signed with the Oakland Raiders on a one-year deal. He was released during final roster cuts on August 30, 2019.

New England Patriots (second stint)
On October 2, 2019, Richards was re-signed by the New England Patriots. He was released on October 22.

Baltimore Ravens
On October 24, 2019, Richards signed with the Baltimore Ravens. In Week 17 against the Pittsburgh Steelers, Richards recovered a punt fumbled by punter Jordan Berry in the end zone for a touchdown during the 28–10 win.

On February 13, 2020, Richards signed a one-year contract extension with the Ravens. He was released from the Ravens on September 5, 2020, and signed to the practice squad the next day. He was elevated to the active roster on September 12 for the team's week 1 game against the Cleveland Browns, and reverted to the practice squad on September 14. He was elevated again on September 19 for the week 2 game against the Houston Texans, and reverted to the practice squad again after the game. He was promoted to the active roster on September 28, 2020.

On January 30, 2021, Richards signed another one-year contract extension with the Ravens.

On August 23, 2021, Richards was released by the Ravens and re-signed to the practice squad on September 1, 2021. He was released on September 8, 2021. On September 28, 2021, Richards was re-signed with to the Ravens practice squad. He was released again on October 27, 2021. He was re-signed on November 8, 2021.

NFL career statistics

Personal life
Richards is a Folsom High School alumnus along with many other professional sports players. His father, Terry, a native of Natick, Massachusetts, played football at Tufts University from 1975-1979 as a defensive lineman. Richards majored in public policy at Stanford.

References

External links
Stanford Cardinal bio
New England Patriots bio

1993 births
Living people
American football safeties
Atlanta Falcons players
Baltimore Ravens players
New England Patriots players
Oakland Raiders players
People from Folsom, California
Sportspeople from Sacramento County, California
Stanford Cardinal football players